Fall River is a village in Columbia County, Wisconsin, United States, along the North Fork of the Crawfish River. The population was 1,712 at the 2010 census. It is part of the Madison Metropolitan Statistical Area.

History
Alfred Brayton, an early settler, named the town after his father's family's home town of Fall River, Massachusetts.

Geography
Fall River is located at  (43.385346, -89.045818).

Demographics

2010 census
As of the census of 2010, there were 1,712 people, 617 households, and 461 families living in the village. The racial makeup of the village was 96.0% White, 0.7% African American, 0.1% Native American, 1.0% Asian, 0.4% from other races, and 1.9% from two or more races. Hispanic or Latino of any race were 2.0% of the population.

There were 617 households, of which 44.4% had children under the age of 18 living with them, 54.9% were married couples living together, 12.5% had a female householder with no husband present, 7.3% had a male householder with no wife present, and 25.3% were non-families. 18.2% of all households were made up of individuals, and 4.3% had someone living alone who was 65 years of age or older. The average household size was 2.77 and the average family size was 3.14.

The median age in the village was 32.5 years. 31.1% of residents were under the age of 18; 8.6% were between the ages of 18 and 24; 31.5% were from 25 to 44; 21.6% were from 45 to 64; and 7.1% were 65 years of age or older. The gender makeup of the village was 49.3% male and 50.7% female.

2000 census
As of the census of 2000, there were 1,097 people, 418 households, and 290 families living in the village. The population density was 756.3 people per square mile (292.1/km2). There were 459 housing units at an average density of 316.5 per square mile (122.2/km2). The racial makeup of the village was 98.63% White, 0.55% African American, 0.09% Native American, 0.27% Asian, and 0.46% from two or more races. Hispanic or Latino of any race were 0.55% of the population.

There were 418 households, out of which 38.0% had children under the age of 18 living with them, 58.1% were married couples living together, 8.4% had a female householder with no husband present, and 30.4% were non-families. 23.2% of all households were made up of individuals, and 11.0% had someone living alone who was 65 years of age or older. The average household size was 2.62 and the average family size was 3.15.

In the village, the population was spread out, with 29.4% under the age of 18, 7.6% from 18 to 24, 34.4% from 25 to 44, 17.9% from 45 to 64, and 10.8% who were 65 years of age or older. The median age was 33 years. For every 100 females, there were 96.9 males. For every 100 females age 18 and over, there were 94.0 males.

The median income for a household in the village was $46,597, and the median income for a family was $54,271. Males had a median income of $35,739 versus $26,161 for females. The per capita income for the village was $19,257. About 4.1% of families and 5.2% of the population were below the poverty line, including 5.4% of those under age 18 and 17.4% of those age 65 or over.

Gallery

Notable people
William H. Proctor, Wisconsin state legislator and farmer, lived in Fall River.

References

External links
 Official website
 Fall River Chamber of Commerce
 Sanborn fire insurance map: 1915

Villages in Columbia County, Wisconsin
Villages in Wisconsin
Madison, Wisconsin, metropolitan statistical area